Tsarebozhiye (Tsar-as-God) is a doctrine that Nicholas II is the redeemer of the sins of the Russian people, that for this reason he possessed a special nature, pure of sin, and Russia is the Kingdom of God on earth, restraining the whole world from acceptance of Antichrist.

The recognized centers of this doctrine are Diveyevo and Bogolyubsky monasteries near Vladimir.

See also 
Caesaropapism

References 

Nicholas II of Russia
Murder of the Romanov family
Heresy in Christianity